Fangale'ounga is a settlement in Foa island, Tonga. It had a population of 140 in 2016.

References

Populated places in Tonga
Haʻapai